Steven R. Gundry (born July 11, 1950) is an American physician and low-carbohydrate diet author. He is a former cardiac surgeon and cardiac surgery researcher, who currently runs his own experimental clinic investigating the impact of diet on health. Gundry was involved in a case in 1990 where an infant with hypoplastic left heart syndrome (a usually fatal disease requiring multiple operations), avoided heart transplant surgery after spontaneously healing. Gundry is the author of The Plant Paradox: The Hidden Dangers in "Healthy" Foods That Cause Disease and Weight Gain, which promotes the controversial lectin-free diet.

He is known for his disputed claims that lectins, a type of plant protein found in numerous foods, cause inflammation resulting in many modern diseases. His Plant Paradox diet suggests avoiding all foods containing lectins. Scientists and dietitians have classified Gundry's claims about lectins as pseudoscience. He sells supplements that he claims protect against or reverse the supposedly damaging effects of lectins.

Career

Cardiothoracic surgeon
Gundry graduated from Yale University with a B.A. in 1972 and went on to earn a medical doctorate at the Medical College of Georgia (a division of Augusta University) in 1977.

People reported in 1990 that an infant boy's heart spontaneously healed itself while waiting weeks on life support for a transplant from Gundry and Leonard Bailey. The boy's recovery made the need for a heart transplant unnecessary, and he received a successful four-hour surgery from Gundry to repair the mitral valve.

During his career as a cardiothoracic surgeon, Gundry published three hundred articles and registered several patents for medical devices.

In 2002 Gundry began transitioning from Clinical Professor of Cardiothoracic Surgery at Loma Linda University School of Medicine (a well-known Seventh-day Adventist institution near Los Angeles) to private practice by starting The International Heart & Lung Institute in Palm Springs, California.

Nutritionist
By mid-2000s Gundry was providing dietary consulting through The Center for Restorative Medicine, a branch of his private surgery practice. While not an accredited dietitian, Gundry's advice focused on heart health and followed conventional wisdom of Western diets such as drinking a glass of red wine per day, increasing intake of plants and nuts, reducing simple carbohydrates, and consuming fish and grass-fed meats.

Gundry has authored books focused on food-based health interventions. Although not mentioned in his first book, Dr. Gundry’s Diet Evolution: Turn Off the Genes That Are Killing You and Your Waistline (2008), his second book, The Plant Paradox (2017), advocates avoiding lectins, a class of proteins found in numerous plants. In 2018 he published an accompanying recipe book.

He is the host of the Dr. Gundry Podcast on health and nutrition. Gundry writes articles for Gwyneth Paltrow's Goop website, which has been criticized for promoting quackery. Gundry has also controversially supported the website of Joseph Mercola for giving "very useful health advice".

Gundry advocates a low-carbohydrate diet. In 2022, he authored Unlocking the Keto Code which promotes a lectin-free ketogenic diet consisting of goat and sheep dairy products, fermented foods, grass-fed beef, shellfish, olive oil and red wine. Gundry's ketogenic diet encourages the consumption of polyphenols, time-restricted eating and "mitochondrial uncoupling" to facilitate weight loss.

Criticisms

Lectins 
T. Colin Campbell, a biochemist and advocate for plant-based diets, states that The Plant Paradox contains numerous unsupported claims and denies that it makes a "convincing argument that lectins as a class are hazardous." Robert H. Eckel, an endocrinologist and past president of the American Heart Association, argues that Gundry's diet advice contradicts "every dietary recommendation represented by the American Cancer Society, American Heart Association, American Diabetes Association and so on" and that it is not possible to draw any conclusions from Gundry's own research due to the absence of control patients in his studies. Writing in New Scientist, food writer and chef Anthony Warner notes that Gundry's theories "are not supported by mainstream nutritional science" and that evidence of the benefits of high-lectin containing diets "is so overwhelming as to render Gundry’s arguments laughable".

Harriet Hall of Science-Based Medicine has noted that Gundry's alleged evidence for the benefits of a lectin-free diet are anecdotal and meaningless as there are no studies with control groups in the medical literature to support his claims. Hall concluded that Gundry is not a reliable source of medical information and the lectin foods "Gundry prohibits are part of a science-based healthy diet. Avoiding them might lead to inadequate nutrition."

Supplements 
Gundry sells supplements that he claims protect against the damaging effect of lectins. Although Today's Dietician acknowledges evidence that consuming lectins in some raw foods like kidney beans can be harmful, it concludes that "preliminary studies have revealed potential health benefits of lectin consumption and minute evidence of harm."

COVID-19

In November 2021, Gundry published a poster abstract in Circulation which claimed that mRNA vaccines against the COVID-19 virus "dramatically increase" inflammation and that this was associated with heart disease. Commentators in British media cited the abstract as evidence of the mRNA vaccines being unsafe. The abstract was not peer-reviewed before publication. The American Heart Association issued an expression of concern, warning that the abstract may not be reliable and that, among other problems, there were "no statistical analyses for significance provided, and the author is not clear that only anecdotal data was used”. The Reuters Fact Check team concluded that it did "not provide reliable evidence that mRNA vaccines increase risk of heart disease". Full Fact noted that the claims in the abstract relied on results from a test for which there was little evidence that it could accurately predict the risk of heart attacks.

Selected publications

References

External links 
 

1950 births
20th-century American physicians
21st-century American physicians
Living people
American cardiac surgeons
American cookbook writers
American health and wellness writers
American nutritionists
Fasting advocates
Loma Linda University faculty
Low-carbohydrate cookbook writers
Low-carbohydrate diet advocates
Medical College of Georgia alumni
Pseudoscientific diet advocates
Yale University alumni